Chryseomicrobium deserti  is a Gram-positive, rod-shaped, aerobic, and non-motile  bacterium from the genus of Chryseomicrobium which has been isolated from desert soil from Korea.

References

External links
Type strain of Chryseomicrobium deserti at BacDive -  the Bacterial Diversity Metadatabase

Bacillales
Bacteria described in 2017